Yuanling Town is a town and the county seat of Yuanling County in Hunan, China. Its seat of local government is at Shenglimen Community.()

References

Yuanling County
County seats in Hunan
Towns of Huaihua